Frank Barnes was an actor, born in 1875. He played the role of Annabelle's Brother in the 1926 silent comedy film, The General. He also worked in the camera and electrical department during the shooting of the movies Words and Music and Neptunes's Daughter

Filmography

References

External links
 

1875 births
American male film actors
American male silent film actors
20th-century American male actors
Year of death missing